

Countess consort of Nassau (1159–1255)

The Walram Line

Countess of Nassau in Wiesbaden, Idstein, and Weilburg (1255–1344)

Countess of Nassau-Wiesbaden-Idstein (1344–1728)

Countess and Princess of Nassau-Saarbrücken (1429–1797)

Countess of Nassau-Ottweiler (1640–1728)

Princess of Nassau-Usingen (1659–1816)

Nassau-Weilburg (1344–1816)

Countess of Nassau-Weilburg (1344–1688)

Princess of Nassau-Weilburg (1688–1816)

Duchess consort of Nassau (1816–1866)

Spouses of the pretenders

The Ottonian Line

Countess of Nassau-Dillenburg

Countess of Nassau-Beilstein

Countess and Princess of Nassau-Hadamar

Countess of Nassau-Siegen

Countess and Princess of Nassau-Siegen (Catholic Branch)

Countess and Princess of Nassau-Siegen (Protestant Branch)

Countess and Princess of Nassau-Dietz

Orange-Nassau

Notes 

 
Lists of Luxembourgian people
Luxembourg history-related lists
Lists of duchesses